Wagner Falls is a waterfall on Wagner Creek near Munising, in Alger County, Upper Michigan. They are in the Wagner Falls Scenic Site, a Michigan State Park of the Michigan Department of Natural Resources.

The falls are located near the junction of M-28 and M-94 and can be reached by a short trail and boardwalk. Water flowing over the falls joins the Anna River below the falls, and flows into Lake Superior near Munising.

References
 Great Lakes Waterfalls: Wagner Falls

External links

Waterfalls of Michigan
Protected areas of Alger County, Michigan
Landforms of Alger County, Michigan
Articles containing video clips